Markovo Polje is a village in Croatia. A cemetery is located there.

References

Populated places in the City of Zagreb